Two Japanese destroyers have been named Tachikaze :

 , a  launched in 1921 and sunk in 1944
 , a  commissioned in 1976 and stricken in 2007

Japanese Navy ship names